The 2014 World RX of Belgium was the 6th round of the inaugural season of the FIA World Rallycross Championship. The event was held at the Circuit Jules Tacheny Mettet in Mettet, Wallonia.

Heats

Semi-finals

Semi-final 1

Semi-final 2

Final

Championship standings after the event

References

External links

|- style="text-align:center"
|width="35%"|Previous race:2014 World RX of Sweden
|width="30%"|FIA World Rallycross Championship2014 season
|width="35%"|Next race:2014 World RX of Canada
|- style="text-align:center"
|width="35%"|Previous race:None
|width="30%"|World RX of Belgium
|width="35%"|Next race:2015 World RX of Belgium
|- style="text-align:center"

Belgium
World RX